The 'Diotallevi Madonna is an oil on panel painting by Raphael, created c. 1504. It is held in the Bode Museum, in Berlin, where it entered in 1841-1842 from Marquess Diotallevi's collection in Rimini. Previously attributed to Raphael's teacher Perugino, almost all art historians now attribute it to Raphael, with the exception of Adolfo Venturi who attributes it and parts of Perugino's Madonna della Consolazione to an anonymous "Master of the Diotallevi Madonna".

The physiognomy and composition still draw heavily on Perugino. Roberto Longhi noted the more archaic painting of the Madonna compared to the work on the Christ Child and John the Baptist, leading him to theorise that it had been worked on around 1500–1502, abandoned and then completed in Florence around 1504–1505.

See also
List of paintings by Raphael

Notes

References

External links
 

1504 paintings
Paintings of the Madonna and Child by Raphael
Paintings in the collection of the Berlin State Museums
Paintings depicting John the Baptist
Nude art